Nasim Osman (31 July 1953 – 30 April 2014) was a Jatiya Party (Ershad) politician and the Member of Parliament from Narayanganj.

Career
Osman was elected to the parliament of Jatiya Sangsad four times in 1986, 1988, 2008, and 2014.

Personal life
Osman's father, AKM Samsuzzoha, was a member of parliament and his youngest brother Shamim Osman is member of parliament from Bangladesh Awami League. Osman died 30 April 2014. After his death, his younger brother, Salim Osman was elected from the same constituency.

Osman was married to Parvin Osman. Together they had a son Azmery Osman, two daughters Irin Osman and Afrin Osman.

References

Bangladesh Jatiya Party politicians
People from Narayanganj District
Place of birth missing
2014 deaths
1953 births
3rd Jatiya Sangsad members
4th Jatiya Sangsad members
9th Jatiya Sangsad members
10th Jatiya Sangsad members